Unleashed is the second and most recent studio album by American rapper Hurricane Chris. It was released on December 21, 2009, by Polo Grounds Music and J Records. This record would later be his final studio release with Polo Grounds and J Records. Recording sessions took place from 2008 to 2009, featuring the executive production from Hurricane Chris himself, alongside Bryan Leach and Anthony Murray. Aside from the executive production, the album features the production from Play-N-Skillz, Shawty Redd and Fiend, among others.

The album was supported by two singles: "Halle Berry (She's Fine)" featuring Superstarr, and "Headboard" featuring Mario and Plies, which both of these singles did not have success on the music charts. Upon its release, the album received mixed or average reviews from critics. Unleashed did not chart internationally, however, it reached at number 46 on the US Billboards R&B/Hip-Hop Albums, and number 20 on the US Billboards Top Rap Albums charts, respectively.

Singles
The album's lead single, called "Halle Berry (She's Fine)", was released on April 15, 2009. The song features guest vocals from a fellow local rapper Superstarr; who later serves its production, along with the duo Play-N-Skillz and Q Smith on this track.

The album's second and final single, called "Headboard" was released on September 4, 2009. The song features guest vocals from American R&B singer-songwriter Mario and fellow American rapper Plies, with production by The Inkredibles.

Reception

Commercial performance
In the United States, Unleashed peaked at number 46 on the Billboards R&B/Hip-Hop Albums, and number 20 on the Billboards Top Rap Albums charts. It did not chart internationally.

Critical response

Unleashed received mixed or average reviews from music critics. At Metacritic, which assigns a normalized rating out of 100 to reviews from mainstream critics, the album received an average score of 54, based on 4 reviews, which indicates "mixed or average reviews". David Jeffries of Allmusic gave the album three out of five stars. The New York Times''' Jon Caramanica gave an unfavorable review. Rolling Stone gave the album two out of five stars. Steve Juon of RapReviews.com gave the highest rated review, seven out of ten stars.

Track listing

Personnel
Credits for Unleashed'' adapted from Allmusic.

 Oluwaseyi Agdeh – composer
 J. Allen – engineer
 Jeremy Allen – composer
 Mimi Armstrong – grooming
 Blade – engineer, producer
 Anita Marisa Boriboon – art direction
 Brandon Bowles – composer
 Ralph Cacciurri – engineer
 Chris Carmouche – mixing
 Maurice Carpenter – composer
 Kevin Cossom – composer
 Kenny "Kennymixx" Daniels – mastering
 Anthony Davis – composer
 Rick De Verona – engineer
 Scorp Dezel – producer
 Christopher Dooley – composer, executive producer
 Leigh Elliott – composer
 Scott Eraas – engineer
 Fiend – producer
 Pablo "Tonton" Gho – engineer
 John "Say" Gillard – engineer
 The Inkredibles – producer
 Amy Johnson – A&R, production coordination
 Raphael Johnson – composer, producer
 Richard Jones – composer
 Fallon King – composer
 Felisha King – composer
 Bryan Leach – executive producer
 Eddie Mix – engineer

 Johnny Mollings – composer
 Lenny Mollings – composer
 Mouse – producer
 Anthony Murray – executive producer
 Isis Nicholson – vocals
 Jamaal Parker – composer
 Shanieke Peru – stylist
 Phunk Dawg – producer
 Play – engineer
 Play N Skillz – producer
 Ari Raskin – engineer
 Rodney Richard – composer
 Rodnae – producer
 Ray Seay – mixing
 Derrick Selby – engineer
 Shawty Redd – producer
 Makeda Smith – A&R, production coordination
 Q. Smith – producer
 Demetrius Stewart – composer
 Superstarr – producer
 Don Vito – producer
 Miles Walker – engineer
 Algernod Washington – composer
 Earl Williams – composer
 Robert Wilson – composer
 Zach Wolfe – photography
 Shah Wonders – illustrations
 Rodney Young – composer

Charts

References

2009 albums
J Records albums
Hurricane Chris (rapper) albums
Albums produced by Shawty Redd
Albums produced by the Inkredibles